Ipofero (trans. Υποφέρω; I Suffer) is the second EP by Greek artist Despina Vandi.

It was released on 13 December 2000 by Minos EMI and certified six times platinum in Greece, selling 120,000 units. It was entirely written by Phoebus and was awarded as being the highest-selling Greek CD single at Virgin Megastores and generally in Greece, by Richard Branson of Virgin Group. The EP also certified four times platinum in Cyprus.

Track listing

Singles and Music videos
All the tracks was released as singles at radio stations and gained massive airplay. The following two official singles was the songs, that was released with music videos and directed by Kostas Kapetanidis.
"Ipofero" (I Suffer)
"Lipamai" (I'm Sorry)

Release history

Charts

Credits and Personnel

Personnel 
Giannis Bithikotsis: mandolin (tracks: 3)

Giorgos Chatzopoulos: guitars (tracks: 2, 3)

Katerina Kiriakou: backing vocals (tracks: 2)

Andreas Mouzakis: drums (tracks: 3)

Alex Panagis: backing vocals (tracks: 2)

Phoebus: computer backing vocals (tracks: 4) || keyboards (tracks: 1) || orchestration (all tracks) || programming (tracks: 1, 2)

Alexandros Vourazelis: keyboards (tracks: 2, 3, 4) || orchestration (tracks: 2) || programming (all tracks)

Martha Zioga: backing vocals (tracks: 2)

Production 
Thodoris Chrisanthopoulos (Fabelsound): mastering

Vaggelis Siapatis: editing, sound engineer

Achilleas Theofilou: executive producer

Manolis Vlachos: mix engineer, sound engineer

Alexandros Vourazelis: sound engineer

Cover 
Panos Kallitsis: hair styling, make up

Kostas Kapetanidis: photographer

Giannis Sarlis: artwork

Credits adapted from the album's liner notes.

Official remixes
Μawahh (Faithless Vs. Despina Jandi)
In 2005, Faithless released a remix of the song "Ipofero" as a b-side in the LP "The Remixes Vol. 1". The remix was entitled "Μawahh" and by typing mistake in the cover, Despina Vandi's name written Despina Jandi (Faithless Vs. Despina Jandi).

Cover versions
2001: Panterite - Tancyvasht cvyat (Μη μου κλείνεις το φως; Пантерите  - Танцуващ свят) (Bulgaria)
2002: Kosta Markov - Izgaryam (Υποφέρω; Коста Марков - Изгарям) (Bulgaria)
2003: Jelena Karleuša - Jos te volim (Υποφέρω; I still love you) (Serbia)
2005: Magic De Spell - Ipofero (Υποφέρω) (Greece)
2015: The String Theory Ensemble - Ipofero (Υποφέρω) (Greece)

References

Despina Vandi songs
Despina Vandi EPs
2000 singles
Greek-language songs
Music videos directed by Kostas Kapetanidis
Songs written by Phoebus (songwriter)
Number-one singles in Greece
Minos EMI singles
2000 songs